Metaclisis is a genus of parasitoid wasps in the family Platygastridae. There are at least 30 described species in Metaclisis.

Species
These 30 species belong to the genus Metaclisis:

 Metaclisis acericola Masner, 1981
 Metaclisis acerina Masner, 1981
 Metaclisis aceris Masner, 1981
 Metaclisis acuta Masner, 1981
 Metaclisis alticola Masner, 1981
 Metaclisis annae Masner, 1981
 Metaclisis areolata (Haliday, 1836)
 Metaclisis attenuata Masner, 1981
 Metaclisis borealis Masner, 1981
 Metaclisis carinata (Ashmead, 1893)
 Metaclisis ensifer Masner, 1981
 Metaclisis erythroupus Ashmead
 Metaclisis filicornis Masner, 1981
 Metaclisis floridana (Ashmead, 1887)
 Metaclisis longula Masner, 1981
 Metaclisis masoni Masner, 1981
 Metaclisis monheimi (Förster, 1861)
 Metaclisis montagnei Maneval, 1936
 Metaclisis ocalea (Walker, 1838)
 Metaclisis phragmitis Debauche, 1947
 Metaclisis pumilio Masner, 1981
 Metaclisis quinda (Walker, 1842)
 Metaclisis rionegroensis Buhl, 2004
 Metaclisis rufithorax Buhl, 2004
 Metaclisis striatitergitis Szabó, 1959
 Metaclisis suecica Buhl, 2010
 Metaclisis sulcata Masner, 1981
 Metaclisis triangulata (Tomsík, 1950)
 Metaclisis verna Masner, 1981
 Metaclisis vernalis Masner, 1981

References

Further reading

 

Parasitic wasps
Articles created by Qbugbot
Platygastridae